O magnum mysterium is a responsorial chant from the Matins of Christmas.

O magnum mysterium may also refer to:
 O magnum mysterium (Lauridsen)
 O magnum mysterium (Palestrina)